These are dams and reservoirs in Germany.

The German word Talsperre (literally: valley barrier) may mean dam, but it is often used to include the associated reservoir as well. The reservoirs are often separately given names ending in -see, -teich or -speicher which are the German words for "lake", "pond" and "reservoir", but in this case all may also be translated as "reservoir". The more specific word for the actual dam is Staumauer and for the lake is Stausee.

Baden-Württemberg
Kleine Kinzig Dam
Nagold Dam
Schluchsee - highest reservoir lake in Germany and largest lake in the Black Forest
Schwarzenbach Dam

Bavaria
Ellertshäuser See
Großer Brombachsee
Forggensee
Frauenau Dam
Sylvenstein Dam
Altmühlsee
Rothsee
Hahnenkammsee

Brandenburg
Spremberg Reservoir

Hesse
Aar Dam
Affoldern Reservoir
Antrift Dam
Diemelsee (reservoir)
Driedorf Reservoir
Edersee

Lower Saxony
 Ecker Dam
 Grane Dam
 Innerste Dam
 Oder Dam
 Oderteich
 Oker Dam
 Söse Dam
 Wendebach Dam

North Rhine-Westphalia
Aabach Dam
Agger Dam
Ahauser Reservoir
Baldeney Reservoir
Bever Dam
Beyenburg Reservoir
Biggesee
Borchen Flood Control Basin
Breitenbach Dam
Bruchbachtal-Büderich Flood Control Basin
Bruch Dam
Dahlhausen Dam
Diepental Dam
Große Dhünn Dam
Dreilägerbach Dam
Ebbinghausen Flood Control Basin
Eicherscheid Flood Control Basin
Eiserbach Dam
Ennepe Dam
Eringerfeld Flood Control Basin
Eschbach Dam
Esmecke Reservoir
Fuelbecke Dam
Fürwigge Dam
Genkel Dam
Glingebach Dam
Glör Dam
Gollentaler Grund Flood Control Basin
Hengsteysee
Kall Dam
Kemnader See
Möhne Reservoir
Olef Dam
Perlenbach Dam
Rur Dam
Sorpe Reservoir
Steinbachtal Dam
Urft Dam
Wahnbach Dam
Wehebach Dam
Wupper Dam

Saxony
Altenberg Reservoir
Bautzen Reservoir
Borna Reservoir
Buschbach Flood Control Basin
Carlsfeld Dam
Cranzahl Dam
Dörnthaler Teich
Dröda Dam
Eibenstock Dam
Einsiedel Dam
Euba Dam
Falkenstein Dam
Forchheim Auxiliary Dam
Friedrichswalde-Ottendorf Flood Control Basin
Gottleuba Dam
Quitzdorf Dam
Sosa Dam
Saidenbach Dam
Wallroda Dam

Saxony-Anhalt
 Ecker Dam
 Kelbra Dam
 Kiliansteich Dam
 Königshütte Dam
 Mandelholz Dam
 Rappbode Dam, highest dam in Germany.
 Rappbode Auxiliary Dam
 Wendefurth Dam
 Wippra Dam
 Zillierbach Dam

Thuringia
In Thuringia there are 171 reservoirs. The biggest of them are:
Bleiloch Dam (biggest reservoir in Germany, volume: ~215 million m³), river Saale
Deesbach Forebay (height 42.5 m; volume ~3.2 million m³), river Lichte
Haselbach Reservoir (~25 million m³), flooded opencast mining area
Hohenwarte Reservoir (volume: ~182 million m³), river Saale
Leibis-Lichte Dam (height 102.5 m; volume ~32,4 million m³), river Lichte
Neustadt Dam - Thuringia's oldest dam
Schmalwasser Dam (~21,2 million m³), river Schmalwasser
Schönbrunn Dam (~23,2 million m³), river Schleuse
Zeulenroda Dam (~30,4 million m³), river Weida

See also
List of dams in the Harz

References 

Dams
Res
Germany

 List